Ericson Public Library is located in Boone, Iowa, United States.  The public library building was a gift of C.J.A. Ericson, a local businessman and politician, who served five terms in the Iowa General Assembly.  While in the state legislature he advocated for libraries on a statewide level.  He was also a longtime member of the Iowa Library Association.

The building was designed in the Renaissance Revival style by the Des Moines architectural firm of Liebbe, Nourse & Rasmussen.  It was completed in 1901, and features a projecting central pavilion  with a Venetian window-piece above the main entrance.  An addition was built onto the rear of the building from 1922 to 1923.  The building was listed on the National Register of Historic Places in 1983.

References

Library buildings completed in 1901
Boone, Iowa
Renaissance Revival architecture in Iowa
Public libraries in Iowa
Libraries on the National Register of Historic Places in Iowa
National Register of Historic Places in Boone County, Iowa
Buildings and structures in Boone County, Iowa